Simmonsville is an unincorporated hamlet in  southwestern Craig County, Virginia, United States. There are no businesses or services there, only a handful of houses.

References

Unincorporated communities in Craig County, Virginia
Unincorporated communities in Virginia